Charles Lyttelton may refer to:

Sir Charles Lyttelton, 3rd Baronet (1628–1716), Governor of Jamaica
Charles Lyttelton (bishop) (1714–1768), Bishop of Carlisle and antiquary
Charles Lyttelton, 8th Viscount Cobham (1842–1922), English cricketer
Charles Lyttelton, 10th Viscount Cobham (1909–1977), Governor General of New Zealand and English cricketer; captain of Worcestershire in the 1930s
Charles Frederick Lyttelton (1887–1931), English cricketer